Herbert J. "Bert" Grover (born February 5, 1937) is a retired American educator and Democratic politician.  He was the c23rd Superintendent of Public Instruction of Wisconsin, serving nearly 12 years (1981–1993).  Earlier in his career, he was a member of the Wisconsin State Assembly, representing Menominee and Shawano counties.

Early life and career
Born in Fond du Lac, Wisconsin, Grover graduated from Shawano High School.  He earned his bachelor's degree from St. Norbert College in De Pere, Wisconsin, in 1959.  He went to work as a legislative assistant to United States Senator William Proxmire in Washington, D.C., and, while there continued his education at American University, where he received his master's degree in international law in 1963.

Wisconsin Assembly years
He returned to Wisconsin to work on a Ph.D. in political science at the University of Wisconsin–Madison, but paused his education to run for Wisconsin State Assembly in 1964.  Running as a first-time candidate Democrat in the heavily-Republican Menominee–Shawano district, he was considered a long-shot against incumbent Theodore Abrahamson, a power broker in Shawano County for over two decades.  Inspired by the campaign tactics of Senator Proxmire, Grover canvassed thousands of farms in the district, covering over 17,000 miles during the campaign.  He made a bid for cross-over Republican votes with the slogan "cross over to Grover" and won Shawano County while the county was only one of four in the state to vote for Senator Barry Goldwater over President Lyndon B. Johnson in the presidential election that year.  Overall, he won 54% of the vote in 1964, went on to win three more elections in the district, and won a fifth term representing the 87th Assembly district, which was drawn to replace most of the territory of his former Menominee–Shawano district in the 1972 redistricting plan.

He served on the Assembly Education Committee throughout his tenure in office, and was chairman for the 1973–1974 session.  Likely the most important contribution of his tenure in the Assembly was helping to shepherd Governor Patrick Lucey's plan to merge the University of Wisconsin System with what had previously been the State University System.

While in the Assembly, he resumed his education, earning his Teaching Certificate from University of Wisconsin–Stevens Point in 1967, and continuing his doctoral work at the University of Wisconsin–Madison, ultimately earning his Ph.D. in educational administration in 1974.  He worked as a teacher in the Shawano area between legislative sessions.

He briefly ran for State Superintendent of Public Instruction in 1973, after receiving the endorsement of political committee formed by a group of educators, but withdrew before the election after failing to receive the endorsement of the Wisconsin Education Association Council—the state teacher's union.

Education service
He resigned from the Assembly in July 1974 to accept an appointment as a special assistant to the newly elected State Superintendent, Barbara Thompson.  Within a few months, however, he accepted another position as superintendent of Niagara, Wisconsin, public schools, where he served for the next four years.  He left Niagara in 1978 to become superintendent of Monona Grove Public Schools—covering Monona, Wisconsin, and neighboring Cottage Grove, in the suburbs of Madison.

In the meantime, in 1976, he had been appointed to the University of Wisconsin Board of Regents by Governor Patrick Lucey.  In June 1979 he was elected president of the board by a vote of the regents.  He resigned less than two years later, in 1980, to launch a campaign for Superintendent of Public Instruction of Wisconsin, challenging his one-time boss, incumbent Barbara Thompson.  Grover had become an outspoken critic of Thompson, who—since the November 1980 election of Ronald Reagan—had taken to publicly campaigning for nomination as United States Secretary of Education.  Grover placed first in the 1981 spring nonpartisan primary, in a field that also included future Wisconsin Secretary of State Doug La Follette, and prevailed in the spring general election with 55% of the vote over his rival, Thompson.  He was reelected twice, in 1985 and 1989, taking a larger share of the vote each time.  He announced he would not seek a fourth term in 1993, amid speculation that he would launch a bid for Governor of Wisconsin in 1994.  Grover instead accepted a job in the Wisconsin Department of Administration to oversee a new state career program for people who do not attend college, the Office of School to Work Transition.

Later years

After leaving government service, he taught at University of Wisconsin–Green Bay for five years, and went into the tree farming business.

Personal life and family
His brother, Thomas G. Grover, was appointed County Judge for Shawano and Menominee counties by Governor Patrick Lucey in December 1975.  He went on to serve over 30 years as a Wisconsin circuit court judge for Shawano and Menominee counties.

Grover and his wife, Caroline, have eight children.

Electoral history

Wisconsin Assembly, Menominee–Shawano district (1964–1970)

Wisconsin Assembly, 87th district (1972)

Wisconsin Superintendent of Public Instruction

| colspan="6" style="text-align:center;background-color: #e9e9e9;"| Nonpartisan Primary, February 17, 1981

| colspan="6" style="text-align:center;background-color: #e9e9e9;"| General Election, April 7, 1981

| colspan="6" style="text-align:center;background-color: #e9e9e9;"| General Election, April 2, 1985

| colspan="6" style="text-align:center;background-color: #e9e9e9;"| Nonpartisan Primary, February 21, 1989

| colspan="6" style="text-align:center;background-color: #e9e9e9;"| General Election, April 4, 1989

References

|-

Politicians from Fond du Lac, Wisconsin
People from Shawano County, Wisconsin
Businesspeople from Wisconsin
American University alumni
St. Norbert College alumni
University of Wisconsin–Madison College of Letters and Science alumni
University of Wisconsin–Stevens Point alumni
University of Wisconsin–Green Bay faculty
Educators from Wisconsin
Democratic Party members of the Wisconsin State Assembly
1937 births
Living people
Superintendents of Public Instruction of Wisconsin